Craigellachie is a small village in Moray, Scotland, at the confluence of the River Spey and River Fiddich (whose valley or glen gives its name to the famous Scotch whisky Glenfiddich), in walking distance of the town of Aberlour.

The name means "Rock of Alarm" and was first applied to the cliff on which much of the village is sited, above the River Spey. Craigellachie dates back to at least 1750, when there was a ferry across the Spey where today's village now stands.  It also stands at the intersection of the A95 from Keith to Aberlour and the A941 from Rothes to Dufftown.

Craigellachie has two malt whisky distilleries (Craigellachie and The Macallan) and is home to the Speyside Cooperage.

Craigellachie Bridge over the River Spey was built by Thomas Telford between 1812 and 1815. A plaque on one of the castellated towers guarding the entrance to the bridge records that the metalwork was cast in Wales: another that the bridge was restored to this, something like its original condition, in 1964. The bridge is a remarkable piece of engineering, and can be viewed from above or below.

Craigellachie railway station, closed in 1968, provided a link between the Strathspey Railway and the Morayshire Railway (later the Great North of Scotland Railway).

Craigellachie is an important stopping off point on the Speyside Way, a long distance path from Buckie in the north to Aviemore in the south.

Prehistory and archaeology 
In advance of the creation of the new distillery and visitor experience at the Macallan distillery, archaeological excavations were undertaken by AOC Archaeology in 2014. The archaeologists found that people had been living and working in the area for thousands of years. There found evidence of people working in the area in the Middle Bronze Age (radiocarbon dates of 1681–1503 cal BC); had built a small settlement in the Late Bronze Age (radiocarbon dates of between 1050 and 800 BC); then a single ring-ditch roundhouse in the Middle Iron Age (radiocarbon dates of 171 BC - AD 51); another small settlement between the ninth to twelfth centuries AD with two post-ring roundhouses; and a 19th century quarry. There was also some evidence (two stone tools) of people being in the area during the Mesolithic period.

Places in Craigellachie
Notable places in Craigellachie include the Fiddichside Inn (reopened early 2020), Highlander Inn, and the Craigellachie Hotel. It has a malt whisky distillery (Craigellachie distillery), The Macallan distillery is also nearby. There is a petrol station in the top half of the village, with a car wash and an electric vehicle charger. A notable nearby sight is Balvenie Castle.  Many distilleries are in the area and available for touring, including most notably, The Macallan, Aberlour, Glenfiddich and The Glenlivet.

Craigellachie Golf Club (now defunct) first appeared 1898 – the club continued until the late 1930s.

The people in Craigellachie are known as Craigellach’s, and have a distinct accent known as the Ellachie twang.

Name connection
Craigellachie, British Columbia, is named after the Scottish village and is the place where the last spike of the Canadian Pacific Railway was driven in November 1885.

The Craigellachie dairy farm has numerous highland cows, where their milk is used to make a mature cheddar. The local residents of the village hold an annual festival, celebrating the farms long history within the area.

References

External links

 Census data
 
 Stand Fast, Craig Ellachie! from Picturesque Scotland by Francis Watt M.A. and the Rev. Andrew Carter M.A.

Villages in Moray